The United Somali Congress (USC) was one of the major rebel organizations in Somalia. Formed in 1987, it played a leading role in the ouster of the government of Siad Barre in 1991, and became a target of the Unified Task Force campaign in 1993. Following infighting, the USC later splintered into smaller groups. By 2000, with the establishment of a Transitional National Government (TNG), a process of disarmament was put in motion and some moderate ex-USC leaders were incorporated into the new interim administration.

History 

With its base centered on the Hawiye clan, the United Somali Congress was founded in Rome in January 1987 by Ali Mohamed Osoble ( Ali Wardhigley ). and others. Although its members largely started off as associates of SODAF, SSDF and SNM, the USC in Rome had its own political program that offered a decentralised system to address the growing discontent with central rule after 10 years of rebel opposition. 

"The USC shall formulate national policies, strategy and plans of action to effectively establish and consolidate a Federal Central Government and a democratically elected parliament that truly represents all the Somali citizen. As well as establish the principle of regional self government. This will help create a systematic decentralisation of governmental institutions and support local planning and decision-making, community initiative and participation which will eventually lead to the people self-reliance in all aspects of their political, social and economic lives"

The USC military wing was formed in late 1987 in Ethiopia, and led by  General Mohamed Farrah Aidid until his demise in 1996. He was succeeded by his son Hussein Mohamed Farrah, by which time the Aidid faction of the organization was also known as the Somali National Alliance (SNA), often the USC/SNA.

The USC was formed in response to severe acts against the Hawiye tribe by the government of Mohamed Siad Barre. During the period of 1987 to 1991, President Barre launched massive crackdowns and use of force against the Hawiye in their homeland in Southern and Central Somalia. The most notable incidents were in Central Somalia in the area near Galkacyo in November 1989 which resulted in the deaths of many civilians at the hands of the Somali National Army. These mass deaths resulted in the future USC Chairman, General Mohammed Farah Aidid quitting his post as Somali Ambassador to India and joined the USC training camps in Mustahiil, Ethiopia.

Military successes by the USC would be instrumental in bringing about the ouster of the Barre government on January the 26th 1991, with the ruler fleeing into exile in Kenya. The USC pursued Barre's forces into Kenya causing a long diplomatic and military row with President Daniel Arap Moi  before he was offered by the then-OAU to retire in Lagos, Nigeria. Despite the victory however, the USC had failed to manage a political settlement with its rivals, the SNM, SPM and the SSDF, and also fragmented within its own leadership after Ali Mahdi Muhammad was declared interim President.

Upon the naming of Ali Mahdi Muhammed as President, the USC split into two. The USC/SNA emerged under Mohammed Aidid and the United Somali Congress/Somali Salvation Alliance (USC/SSA) of Ali Mahdi Muhammed. The USC/SNA came under the control of Mohamed Aidid's son, Hussein Mohamed Farah Aidid after the father's death in 1996. The USC/SSA eventually came under control of the Deputy Chairman, Musa Sudi Yalahow.

Both USC factions made peace with each other in August 1998, though this caused a violent split between Yalahow and Ali Mahdi Muhammed, and fighting continued in Mogadishu. Eventually, both Hussein Aidid and Yalahow reconciled and joined the Somali Reconciliation and Restoration Council (SRRC) in 2002, in opposition to the Transitional National Government (TNG). This caused a rift between the USC/SSA supporters of Yalahow and Omar Muhamoud Finnish (also known as Mahmud Muhammad Finish), who continued to support the TNG. Fighting between the two caused many deaths in Mogadishu.

In 2001, Hussein Aidid founded the Somalia Reconciliation and Restoration Council (SRRC), a new armed opposition group. Growing out of the Somali National Alliance, it was originally formed to oppose the nascent Transitional National Government (TNG) and the Juba Valley Alliance (JVA) in the 2001–2004 period. However, it eventually settled its differences with the government in 2004, with some moderate leaders incorporated into the new interim administration.

Notable personnel
 Mohamed Farrah Aidid
 Ali Mohamed Osoble ( Ali Wardhigley )
 Ali Mahdi Muhammad
 Mohamed Afrah Qanyare
 Musa Sudi Yalahow
 Omar Muhamoud Finnish

Timeline of the USC
 1987–1991 USC foundation to the overthrow of Siad Barre
 1991–1992 Mohammed Aidid (USC Aidid) vs. Ali Mahdi Mohammed (USC Mahdi) until the foundation of the USC/SNA
 1992–1995 USC/SNA and USC/SSA vs the UN intervention
 1995–1998 USC/SNA vs. USC/SSA after the UN departure until the reconciliation
 1998–2001 USC/SSA infighting between Ali Mahdi Mohammed and Musa Sudi Yalahow
 2001–2002 USC/SSA infighting between Musa Sudi Yalahow (SRRC) vs. Omar Muhamoud Finnish (TNG)
 2003–Several USC commanders disarm their militia; some incorporated into nascent interim government

See also
 Politics of Somalia
 Somali Civil War
 Factions in the Somali Civil War

References

External links
World Travel Guide – History and Government of Somalia
Dagne, Ted (2002). "Africa and the War on Terrorism". CRS Report for Congress, Washington (DC):Library of Congress.

Defunct political parties in Somalia
Political parties established in 1989
Factions in the Somali Civil War
1987 establishments in Somalia